Siam Amazing Park, more commonly known as Siam Park City or Suansiam, is an amusement and water park located in the Khan Na Yao district of Bangkok, Thailand. It was founded in November 1980 and remains the oldest amusement and water park complex in Southeast Asia. Located near Bangkok's Suvarnabhumi Airport, it contains attractions such as Southeast Asia's first suspended looping coaster with five inversions, a large wave pool, and 7-storey slides.

Park history
Siam Park City is an amusement park in Khan Na Yao District of Bangkok. The park is spread over 100 acres, divided into a water park and an amusement park. The water park includes seven attractions, including a 13,600-square-metre wave pool certified as the world's largest by the Guinness World Records since 2009. The amusement park contains around 40 rides, including Vortex, one of the largest suspended roller-coasters and Giant Drop, a free-fall ride.

The park was constructed by a group of Thai elites and later established by the real-estate developer Chaiwat Luangamornlert. 

Siam Park City was opened on 19 November 1980 under the name of "Suansiam" as the first water park in Thailand and the only man-made beach in Bangkok. The park began with a water park and a few rides, but it was later expanded and the slogan was changed to "World of Eternal Fun and Happiness". The park now has two million visitors a year and has some of the largest rides in the region.

Siam Park City is not only the first park opened in Thailand,  it is also the longest-running park in the country.

In the fourth quarter of 2019, Siam Park City was rebranded as Siam Amazing Park, although locals still refer to it by its original name.

Areas and attractions
Water Park with a Wave Pool, Flowing Pool, Speed Slide, Super Spiral, Mini Slide, Kidz ProRacer, Kidz MiniRiver, Kidz Twister, RideHouse, and Spa.
Amusement Park with approximately 30 rides including Vortex, Boomerang, Log Flume, Giant Drop, Si-Am Tower and Grand Canyon Express.
Museum and Family Ride comprises Dinotopia, Jurassic Adventure, and Africa Adventure.
Event Facilities- designed to support events of all sizes.
Scout Camp

Theme Park attractions

 VortexOne of the two largest suspended looping coasters in the world, and the first of its kind in South East Asia. It is 765 meters long and consists of 5 inversions and several drops. Designed and built by Vekoma, a Dutch (Netherlands) ride builder.
 Giant Drop an Intamin 75-meter free-fall drop tower ride.
 BoomerangShuttle roller coaster with 3 inversions. It is a popular coaster model from Vekoma.
 Log FlumeThe park's newest attraction.
 TopspinLaunches riders up to the sky and then spin them in and out of connected fountains.
 Si-Am TowerA 109-meter high HUSS observation tower which offers a 360-degree panorama of Bangkok.
 Mega DanceA HUSS rare Mega Dance ride that swings riders around with its spider-like arms.
 Double-Deck Merry-Go-RoundOne of the first attractions installed at the park and is a double decker merry-go-round.
 Twin DragonPirate ship ride with a dragon theme.
 Africa AdventureOne of the newest additions to the park. Riders can choose to go on either a boat or train trip around the Island, seeing animatronics of tigers, elephants, and even King Kong.
 Jurassic AdventureA Jeep ride into the world of ancient creatures. Using Animatronics riders will see over 30 different species of dinosaurs, and an exploding volcano.
 DinotopiaDinosaur museum. Here riders will learn the history behind these amazing creatures.
 Condor Spinning ride that launches riders 24 meters into the sky.
 Aladin A flying carpet with centrifugal spin.
 Astrofighter
 TrabantUFO-themed thrill ride.
 Enterprise360-degree thrill ride without any safety belts.
 Astro-LinerSpace-themed flight simulator.
 MonsterSpinning thrill ride for adults.
 Rock & Roll
 Tagada DiscoSpinning giant plate ride, featuring high G-force levels.
 Big-Double ShockA haunted house tour.
 Balloon RaceA ride that opened in 2009.

Water Park attractions

 Talay Krung Thep
The world's biggest wave pool with cascading waterfalls and numerous rock pools.

 Speed Slides
The 75 feet high slider that was recorded as the tallest water slide in the world in 1970.

 Super Spiral
4 integrated spiraling slides at varying levels.

 Lazy River
The flowing river moving throughout the water park.

 Spa Club
The health spa club with original Thai massage.

Honors and awards 
Largest wave pool

On 30 April 2009, Guinness World Records adjudication executive Talal Omar formally recognized the 13,600-m2 (146,389-ft2) wave pool at the Siam Park City leisure park in Bangkok, Thailand, as the largest on the planet at a ceremony hosted by Veerasak Kowsurat, President of the Board of Directors of the Tourism Authority of Thailand. Kowsurat and Chaiwat Luangamornlert, owner and Chairman of Siam Park City Co., Ltd, received the official Guinness World Records certificate at the event, which took place alongside the sprawling wave pool. According to Siam Park City representatives, the wave pool has sometimes been called Bangkok’s inland sea for nearly 30 years and is a very popular attraction in the park.

Outstanding Performance for Recreational Attraction and Entertainment
On 27 September 2010, Siam Park City received an award for outstanding contribution to the entertainment business by the Tourism Authority of Thailand.

Notable events
 1985 final Miss Thailand contest
 Carabao National Service Concert – 6 July 1986
 Non-title boxing match between Sot Chitalada vs. Moon Jin Choi from South Korea – 30 August 1986
 Exhibit lantern puppets and dinosaur skeletons from Zigong, Sichuan Province, China – late 1992 to late 1993
 In 1993 Michael Jackson visited Siam Park during his Dangerous World Tour.
 MV Koi Suru Fortune Cookie (Thai version) of BNK48 – 4 November 2017

Accidents
In October 2007, one women was killed and another six were injured when the Indiana Log Slide ride malfunctioned due to an electrical shortage. This ride has been removed by the park. In March 2008, 24 children were injured when the Super Spiral Waterslide collapsed when a joint broke loose.

Former attractions
About two decades a railway circled the area of the park. This railway is now out of use, but the trains are still kept at the former roofed storage sidings.

See also
 Dream World (Thai amusement park)
 Safari World

References

External links

Siam Amazing Park Official website
 Thai girl group sensation Candy Maffia visit Siam Park
 http://beta.online-station.net/news/game/14874
 Tourism Authority Of Thailand

Amusement parks in Thailand
Water parks in Thailand
Animatronic attractions
Khan Na Yao district
Tourist attractions in Bangkok
Buildings and structures in Bangkok
1980 establishments in Thailand
Amusement parks opened in 1980